Oligotrophini is a tribe of gall midges, insects in the family Cecidomyiidae. There are at least 20 genera and 300 described species in Oligotrophini.

Genera
These 21 genera belong to the tribe Oligotrophini.

References

Further reading

External links

 

Cecidomyiinae
Brachycera tribes